This is a list of television programs currently broadcast by all channels of Phoenix Television.

Phoenix Chinese Channel

News and information
 Asian Journal
 Breaking News
 Good Morning China
 Information Express
 Midnight News Express
 Observation Post Of Military Situation
 Omni Media Online
 Omni Media Weekly
 Phoenix Afternoon Express
 Phoenix Focal Point
 Phoenix News Express
 Phoenix Weather Report
 Pic of the Day
 Weekend Midnight Express
 Weekend Morning News
 The World This Week

Opinion
 Eye on World
 From Phoenix To The World
 Lawrence's Viewpoint
 Newsline
 Peter Qiu's Talk
 Strategy Room
 Summary of Press
 Taiwan Talk Show
 Tiger Talk

History and culture
 Architectures Dream
 China Forum
 Cultural Kaleidoscope
 Earth Report
 Eight Minutes Reading
 Emergent China
 Inspiring Anecdotes
 My Patriotic Heart
 Panoramic Eyeshot of Phoenix
 Premium Spectacular
 A Quote from Celebs

Interview
 Behind the Headlines With Wen Tao
 A Date with Luyu
 Mainland Q&A
 Starface
 Talk With The World Leaders

Social issues
 Charity China
 Chit Chat with Me
 The Days We've Been Through
 Global Characters
 Grasp a Dream
 Harmony Society
 Secret Documentary
 Social Watch
 To 2014: To Children

Business
 Approaching Business and Politics
 Elite Converge
 Head Start In Finance
 Shi Ping Financial Report
 Weekly Finance Update

Entertainment and fashion
 Entertainment Whirlwind
 Health Express
 Inside Phoenix
 Trendy Guide
 Star Cinema
 Taste

Special programmes
 Miss Chinese Cosmos Pageant
 You Bring Charm to the World Award Ceremony

Others
 Phoenix Selection
 Tracing

Programming block
 Phoenix Buster
 Phoenix Horizons

Phoenix Chinese news and entertainment

Original programmes
 China France 50 Years
 Europe China Journal
 Europe Chinese Report
 Europe Special Program
 Financial Focus
 Shenzhen Glamour

Programming block
 Asian Theatre
 China Taiping Insurance Phoenix Drama
 Phoenix Horizons
 Select Theatre

Phoenix North America Chinese Channel

Original programmes
 America Today
 Cooking Show
 Dream House
 Health & Beauty
 Hot Topic of Chinese
 News Talk
 Parenting
 Phoenix North America News
 Route to Fine Wine
 See Aboard
 Wall Street Weekly

Programming block
 Asian Theatre
 Phoenix Drama
 Phoenix Horizons
 Select Theatre

Phoenix Infonews Channel

News and information
 Asian Journal
 China News Live
 Global Online
 Good Morning China
 Midnight News Express
 Omni Media Weekly
 Phoenix Afternoon Express
 Phoenix Weather Report
 Weekend Midnight Express
 Weekend Morning News
 The World This Week

Opinion
 Chief Editor Time
 Current Affairs Debate
 Hong Kong Viewpoint
 News Talk
 News Zone
 Taiwan Weekly Focus
 Weekend Hot Talk

History and culture
 Architectures Dream
 China Forum

Interview
 Mainland Q&A

Social issues
 Media Assembly

Business
 Approaching Business and Politics
 China Financial Intelligence
 Elite Converge
 Financial Journal
 Phoenix Business Daily

Entertainment and fashion
 Entertainment News Report
 Phoenix Info Billboard

Phoenix Hong Kong Channel

News and information
 News on the Hour 1800
 Phoenix Afternoon News
 Phoenix Morning News
 Phoenix News Express
 Phoenix Night News

History and culture
 Canton Chatter
 My Patriot Heart
 Panoramic Eyeshot of Phoenix

Interview
 Culture Talk with Jimmy Ching
 A Date with Luyu
 News Decoder
 Starface
 Speak Out Hong Kong

Social issues
 Cross-Strait Explorer

Business
 Money Bang

Entertainment and fashion
 Medi Apps

Programming block
 Info Stream
 On Stage
 The True Man Show

Original programmes and programming block from Phoenix Hong Kong Channel America
 Antique Today
 Cantonese Drama
 Dream House
 Health & Beauty
 Jinglan Drama
 Parenting
 Phoenix North America News
 Route to Fine Wine
 See Aboard

See also
 Phoenix Television

Phoenix Television
Phoenix Television programs